George B. Senter (September 24, 1826 – January 16, 1870) was the mayor of Cleveland from 1859 to 1860.

Life and career
Senter was born in Potsdam, New York to David K. and Susan Senter.  Senter was elected to city council from the 1st ward in 1858 and was then elected to mayor in 1859 serving until 1860.  It is assumed, since there is no military record for Senter, that he served in the Civil War as assistant commissary-subsistence officer at Camp Taylor in Cleveland in April and May 1861.  He was promoted to commandant of the camp in 1862 serving until 1864.  When Irvine Masters, mayor of Cleveland, resigned his office in 1864, Senter was elected by city council once again to serve as mayor and finish Masters's term.  Senter retired from political life to practice law and pursue the wine and liquor business.

He died in 1870 and was buried at Woodland Cemetery in Cleveland, Ohio.

Senter married Delia Wheaton in 1851 and they had three children:  George B. Senter Jr., Cornelia E., and J. Augusta.

References

 The Encyclopedia Of Cleveland History by Cleveland Bicentennial Commission (Cleveland, Ohio), David D. Van Tassel (Editor), and John J. Grabowski (Editor)

External links

 

Mayors of Cleveland
1827 births
1870 deaths
19th-century American politicians
Burials at Woodland Cemetery (Cleveland)